is a railway station in Higashiyodogawa-ku, Osaka, Japan, operated by the private operator Hankyu Railway.

Lines
Awaji Station is an intersection of the following two Hankyu Railway lines:
Hankyu Senri Line 
Hankyu Kyoto Line 

In March 2019, the nearby JR-Awaji Station of the Osaka Higashi Line owned by West Japan Railway Company (JR West) has been inaugurated.

Station layout
This station has two island platforms with four tracks at ground level.

Platforms

Adjacent stations

History
Awaji Station opened on 1 April 1921.

Station numbering was introduced to all Hankyu stations on 21 December 2013 with this station being designated as station number HK-63.

Future plans 
Work is being done as of 2012 to elevate a  X-shaped section of track from Sōzenji Station to Kami-Shinjō Station on the Kyoto Line and from Kunijima Station to Shimo-Shinjō Station on the Senri Line (including Awaji station from which the aforementioned stations are adjacent stations). Construction began in 2008 and was expected to be completed in 2017 with full operation on the elevated tracks beginning in 2020. However in 2015 it was determined that the original completion date could not be achieved, and the finish date was pushed back to 2024 with operations beginning that year. Nevertheless, some reports have suggested that the project would not be completed until 2031 owing to the effects of the COVID-19 pandemic as well as delays in land acquisition.

References

External links

 Hankyu station information 

Railway stations in Japan opened in 1921
Railway stations in Osaka
Higashiyodogawa-ku, Osaka
Hankyu Kyoto Main Line